Aglaia tenuicaulis is a species of plant in the family Meliaceae. It is found in Brunei, Indonesia, Malaysia, Singapore, Thailand, and possibly the Philippines.

References

tenuicaulis
Vulnerable plants
Taxonomy articles created by Polbot